The International Amateur Handball Federation (IAHF) was the administrative and controlling body for handball and field handball. IAHF was responsible for the organisation of handball's major international tournaments, notably the World Men's Handball Championship, which commenced in 1938, and the World Men's Outdoor Handball Championship, which commenced in 1938. The organization was dissolved after World War II.

History 
On 13. September 1925 the first international field handball game between Germany and Austria happened. Because of this event, uniform rules and an international association were desired.

In 1926, the International Amateur Athletics Federation (IAAF, now known as World Athletics) created a commission to govern all ball games played with the hands, such as field-handball, court-handball, volleyball and basketball. In the same year the first international field handball rules were created in The Hague.

Two years later during the 1928 Summer Olympics the IAAF invited national representatives to create an independent federation. Representatives from 11 countries founded the International Amateur Handball Federation on 4th of August 1928 in Amsterdam. The later IOC president Avery Brundage and Lauri Pihkala how invented Pesäpallo were founding members.

The International Olympic Committee recognized handball as Olympic sport in 1933. Three years later during the 1936 Summer Olympics field handball had its first and last appearance at the Summer Olympics. At this point IAHF had 23 members.

In 1938 the first Outdoor and  Indoor World Men's Handball Championship were organized by the IAHF.

In 1946 the successor the International Handball Federation was founded by Denmark and Sweden.

Basketball 

In 1934, oversight of basketball was transferred to the Fédération Internationale de Basketball (FIBB, now abbreviated FIBA).

Volleyball 
The first (failed) attempt to create an independent volleyball federation at the 1934 IAHF congress in Stockholm. During a friendly match between the Czech and French national teams on 26 August 1946 the two nations and Poland created a document to create an international federation. The following year 14 nations founded the FIVB in Paris between 18 and 20 April.

Presidents

Members 
Following counties were member of the IAHF as of the 4th IAHF-Congress:

References

 
 

International sports organizations
IOC-recognised international federations
International organisations based in Germany
Organisations based in Munich
Sports organizations established in 1928
1928 establishments in the Netherlands